Lorin M. Hitt is an American economist, currently the Zhang Jingdong Professor of Operations, Information and Decisions at the Wharton School of the University of Pennsylvania.

Bibliography

References

Year of birth missing (living people)
Living people
University of Pennsylvania faculty
American economists
Information systems researchers